Finishing can refer to:

Finishing (whisky), a whisky making method that involves aging of multiple casks
Finishing (bookbinding), the process of embellishing a book
Finishing (manufacturing), processes that are applied to a workpiece's surface
Finishing (textiles), processes applied to fabrics after weaving
Wood finishing, the process of embellishing and/or protecting the surface
Attendance at a finishing school
Finishing, the act or skill of scoring in soccer
Reaching orgasm during sexual intercourse or masturbation.

See also
Finish (disambiguation)